Anna Katherine "Kay" Behrensmeyer is an American taphonomist and paleoecologist. She is a pioneer in the study of the fossil records of terrestrial ecosystems and engages in geological and paleontological field research into the ecological context of human evolution in East Africa. She is Curator of Vertebrate Paleontology in the Department of Paleobiology at the Smithsonian Institution's National Museum of Natural History (NMNH). At the museum, she is co-director of the Evolution of Terrestrial Ecosystems program and an associate of the Human Origins Program.

Education and career
Behrensmeyer received her bachelor of Arts degree from Washington University in St. Louis.

In 1968, Behrensmeyer made a detailed investigation of Lothagam, a Kenyan paleontological formation dating to the late Miocene-early Pliocene period. Within the succession, she identified six lithostratigraphic units. She later compiled a chart for the 400 fossil specimens collected in 1967 and published a faunal list for Lothagam 3 in 1976.

While she was a graduate student at Harvard in 1969, Behrensmeyer was invited by paleoanthropologist Richard Leakey to be his team's geologist and map fossil deposits at Koobi Fora in Kenya. She discovered a cluster of stone tools eroding out of a volcanic tuff, an ash layer from an ancient eruption that filled a small paleochannel. The site was named in her honor and the layer was named the Kay Behrensmeyer Site Tuff or KBS Tuff. The tools were similar to those discovered by Mary Leakey at Olduvai Gorge. The team's radiometric dating indicated that the fossils were 2.6 million years old. The dating of the site was controversial, as it contradicted other paleobiological evidence. A later independent investigation revised the date to 1.9 mya.

Behrensmeyer received her Ph.D. in vertebrate paleontology and sedimentology from Harvard University's Department of Geological Sciences in 1973. Her dissertation, published in 1975, showed that the composition of the fossil vertebrate faunas of East Turkana, Kenya, varied with sedimentary environment (channel, floodplain, lake margin), and this provide new information on the taphonomy and paleoecology of hominin-bearing, Plio-Pleistocene sediments . She held post-doctoral positions at UC Berkeley and Yale and taught for UC Santa Cruz's Earth Science Board before beginning her career at the Smithsonian Institution in 1981. Since 1986, she has led research on the geological context of Olorgesailie.

Since 1987, Behrensmeyer has been the co-director of Evolution of Terrestrial Ecosystems Program at the National Museum of Natural History. From 1993 to 1996, she served as Acting Associate Director for Science at NMNH. She has served as Associate Editor for the Paleobiology, PALAIOS and Palaeoclimates journals. From 1985 to 1987, she was on the Board of Associate Editors for the Journal of Human Evolution. She is also an Adjunct Professor at the University of Arizona and George Washington University.

Aside from Behrensmeyer's research into the paleoecology and taphonomy of hominid-bearing deposits in the Olorgesailie basin, Baringo basin and East Turkana, she has  conducted a long-term study of the taphonomy of modern vertebrate remains in Kenya's Amboseli National Park beginning in 1975, in collaboration with ecologist David Western. The study involves a census of live animals and carcasses every five to 10 years. The study suggests that fossil animal assemblages in tropical settings can be used to make inferences about ancient habitats when post-depositional taphonomic biases are accounted for. Her other projects include field exploration and analysis of Upper Triassic – Lower Jurassic vertebrate taphonomy and paleoecology in Arizona and paleoecological research in the Miocene Pakistan Siwalik sequence. Behrensmeyer is also compiling a taphonomic reference collection of bones and fossils at the National Museum of Natural History.

She was named one of the "50 Most Important Women Scientists" by Discover magazine in 2002.

Honors and awards
2016: Raymond C. Moore Medal of the Society for Sedimentary Geology
2018: Romer-Simpson Medal of the Society of Vertebrate Paleontology
2018: Paleontological Society Medal
 2019: G. K. Warren Prize
2020: Elected Member of the National Academy of Sciences

Selected publications
Behrensmeyer has published over 130 scientific articles.
Behrensmeyer, A. K. (1970) "Preliminary geological interpretation of a new hominid site in the Lake Rudolf Basin." Nature 226 (5242):225–226.
Isaac, G., Leakey, R., Behrensmeyer, A. (1971) "Archeological traces of early hominid activities east of Lake Rudolf, Kenya." Science 173:1129–1134.
Behrensmeyer, A. K. (1975) "The Taphonomy and Paleoecology of Plio-Pleistocene Vertebrate Assemblages East of Lake Rudolf, Kenya." Bulletin MCZ 145 (10):473–574. (Ph.D. Dissertation)
Behrensmeyer, A. K. (1978) "The habitat of Plio-Pleistocene hominids in East Africa: taphonomic and microstratigraphic guidance." In: C. Jolly (ed.), Early Hominids of Africa (Duckworth: London), pp. 165–189.
Behrensmeyer, A. K., Hill A. (Editors). (1980) Fossils in the Making: Vertebrate Paleoecology and Taphonomy (Chicago: University of Chicago Press). 338 pp.
Behrensmeyer, A. K., Laporte, L.F. (1981) "Footprints of a Pleistocene Hominid in Northern Kenya." Nature 289: 167–169.
Behrensmeyer, A. K. (1985) "Taphonomy and the paleoecologic reconstruction of hominid habitats in the Koobi Fora Formation." In: Coppens, Y., Ed., L'environment des hominides au Plio-Pleistocene. (Paris: Foundation Singer-Polignac). pp. 309–324.
Behrensmeyer, A. K., Gordon, K. D., Yanagi, G. T. (1986) "Trampling as a cause of bone surface damage and pseudo-cutmarks." Nature 319:768–771.
Behrensmeyer, A. K. (1991) "Terrestrial Vertebrate Accumulations." pp. 291–335 in Allison, P. and Briggs, D. E. G. Taphonomy: Releasing the Data Locked in the Fossil Record. New York: Plenum.
Behrensmeyer, A. K. Hook, R.W. (1992) "Paleoenvironmental contexts and taphonomic modes in the terrestrial fossil record." In: Behrensmeyer, A. K., Damuth, J. D., DiMichele, W. A., Potts, R., Sues, H.-D., Wing, S.L. Terrestrial Ecosystems Through Time, pp. 15–136. (Chicago: University of Chicago Press).
Behrensmeyer, A. K., Potts, R., Plummer, T., Tauxe, L., Opdyke, N., Jorstad, T. (1995) "Stratigraphy, chronology, and paleoenvironments of the Pleistocene locality of Kanjera, western Kenya." Journal of Human Evolution 29: 247–274.
Isaac, G. L., Behrensmeyer, A. K. (1997) "Chapter 2: Geological Context and Paleoenvironments." pp. 12–53. In: Koobi Fora Research Project Volume 5: Plio-Pleistocene Archaeology. Glynn L. Isaac and B. Isaac, Eds. Oxford: Clarendon Press. 556 pp.
Behrensmeyer, A. K., Todd, N.E., Potts, R., McBrinn, G.E. (1997) "Late Pliocene faunal turnover in the Turkana Basin, Kenya and Ethiopia." Science 278:1589–1594.
Potts, R., Behrensmeyer, A.K., Ditchfield, P. (1999) "Paleolandscape variation and early Pleistocene hominid activities: Members 1 and 7, Olorgesailie Formation." Journal of Human Evolution 37:747–788.
Behrensmeyer, A. K., Potts, R., Deino, A., Ditchfield, P. (2002) "Olorgesailie, Kenya: A million years in the life of a rift basin." Sedimentation in Continental Rifts, Renaut, R.W. and Ashley, G.M, Eds.) SEPM Special Publication 73: 97–106.
Bobe, René, Behrensmeyer, A.K. (2004) "The expansion of grassland ecosystems in Africa in relation to mammalian evolution and the origin of the genus Homo." Palaeogeography, Palaeoclimatology, Palaeoecology 207: 399–420.
Potts, R., Behrensmeyer, A.K., Deino, A., Ditchfield, P., Clark, J. (2004) "Small mid-Pleistocene hominin associated with East African Acheulean technology." Science 305: 75–78.
Behrensmeyer, A. K. (2006) "Climate change and human evolution." Science 311:476–478.
Behrensmeyer, A. K. (2008) "Paleoenvironmental context of the Pliocene A.L. 333 “First Family” Hominin Locality, Denen Dora Member, Hadar Formation, Ethiopia." GSA Special Paper 446: The Geology of Early Humans in the Horn of Africa, edited by Jay Quade and Jonathan Wynn, pp. 203–214.
Western, D., Behrensmeyer, A.K. (2009) "Bones track community structure over four decades of ecological change." Science 324: 1061–1064.

References

External links
National Museum of Natural History staff page
 Evolution of Terrestrial Ecosystems staff page

Year of birth missing (living people)
Living people
American paleontologists
Paleozoologists
Taphonomists
Academic journal editors
Women paleontologists
Women zoologists
George Washington University faculty
Harvard University alumni
University of Arizona faculty
Washington University in St. Louis alumni
Members of the United States National Academy of Sciences
20th-century American zoologists
21st-century American zoologists
20th-century American women scientists
21st-century American women scientists
20th-century American non-fiction writers
21st-century American non-fiction writers
20th-century American women writers
21st-century American women writers
Smithsonian Institution people